Warren James Bone is a former defensive end in the National Football League.

Biography
Bone was born Warren James Bone on November 4, 1964 in Fairfield, Alabama.

Career
Bone was a member of the Green Bay Packers during the 1987 NFL season. He played at the collegiate level at Texas Southern University.

See also
List of Green Bay Packers players

References

1964 births
Living people
People from Fairfield, Alabama
Green Bay Packers players
American football defensive ends
Texas Southern University alumni
Texas Southern Tigers football players